Amphotis is a genus of sap-feeding beetles in the family Nitidulidae. There are about eight described species in Amphotis.

Species
These eight species belong to the genus Amphotis:
 Amphotis bella Heer, 1847
 Amphotis depressa Theobald, 1937
 Amphotis marginata (Fabricius, 1781)
 Amphotis martini C.Brisout de Barneville, 1878
 Amphotis oeningensis Heer, 1862
 Amphotis orientalis Reiche, 1861
 Amphotis schwarzi Ulke, 1887
 Amphotis ulkei LeConte, 1866

References

Further reading

External links

 

Nitidulidae
Articles created by Qbugbot